Windsor Mills Bridge, also known as Wiswell Road Bridge or Warner Hollow Road Bridge, is a covered bridge that carries Covered Bridge Lane, formerly Wiswell Road, across Phelps Creek in Windsor Township, Ashtabula County, Ohio, United States.  The bridge, one of currently 17 drivable bridges in the county, is a single-span Town truss design. The bridge was built in 1867 using white pine. It sits atop cut stone abutments, one made of sandstone quarried nearby, and the other made of creek stone. The bridge was bypassed in the 1960s and closed to traffic, and Wiswell Road was rerouted west of the creek. In the 1980s, the bridge was completely closed due to safety reasons.  It underwent extensive renovation from 2002 to 2004, and was then reopened to all traffic, except for trucks and buses.  The bridge is listed in the National Register of Historic Places.  The bridge's WGCB number is 35-04-25, and it is located approximately 5.0 mi (8.0 km) west of Orwell.

History
1867 – Bridge constructed.
2002-04 – Bridge renovated.
2004 – Bridge rededicated.

Dimensions
Length: 120 feet (36.6 m)

Gallery

See also
List of Ashtabula County covered bridges

References

External links
Ohio Covered Bridges List
Ohio Covered Bridge Homepage
The Covered Bridge Numbering System
Ohio Historic Bridge Association
Warner Hollow Road Covered Bridge from Ohio Covered Bridges, Historic Bridges

Covered bridges in Ashtabula County, Ohio
National Register of Historic Places in Ashtabula County, Ohio
Covered bridges on the National Register of Historic Places in Ohio
Bridges completed in 1867
1867 establishments in Ohio
Road bridges on the National Register of Historic Places in Ohio
Wooden bridges in Ohio
Lattice truss bridges in the United States